Little Otter River may refer to:

Little Otter River (Canada)
Little Otter River (Virginia)

See also
Little Otter Creek